Richard Barrow Cadbury (29 August 1835 – 22 March 1899) was an English entrepreneur, chocolate-maker and philanthropist. He was the second son of the Quaker John Cadbury, founder of Cadbury's cocoa and chocolate company.

Together with his younger brother George he took over the family business in 1861. Richard was the first to commercialise the connection between romance and confectionery with the company producing a heart-shaped box of chocolates for Valentine's Day in 1868. In 1878 they acquired 14 acres (57,000 m2) of land in open country, four miles (6 km) south of Birmingham where they opened a new factory in 1879. Over the following years, more land was acquired and a model village was built for his workers, which became known as Bournville.

He donated Moseley Hall to the City of Birmingham, for use as a children's convalescent home.

Cadbury died on 22 March 1899 in Jerusalem, aged 63.

In 1905 the executors of Cadbury's estate distributed £40,000 to various charities including £10,000 to the Temperance Hospital in London.

His wife Emma died in 1907 after falling down some stairs while at sea on the Empress of India. His daughter Beatrice Boeke-Cadbury worked as an educational reformer and, for her work saving Jewish children during the Holocaust, was posthumously honoured as one of the Righteous Among the Nations.

References

External links

1835 births
1899 deaths
Cadbury, Richard
Cadbury, Richard
Cadbury, Richard
19th-century English businesspeople